Twist-related protein 2 is a protein that in humans is encoded by the TWIST2 gene. The protein encoded by this gene is a basic helix-loop-helix (bHLH) transcription factor and shares similarity with another bHLH transcription factor, TWIST1.  bHLH transcription factors have been implicated in cell lineage determination and differentiation. It is thought that during osteoblast development, this protein may inhibit osteoblast maturation and maintain cells in a preosteoblast phenotype.

Interactions
TWIST2 has been shown to interact with SREBF1.

Clinical significance
Mutations in the TWIST2 gene that alter DNA-binding activity through both dominant-negative and gain-of-function effects are associated with ablepharon macrostomia syndrome and Barber–Say syndrome.

References

Further reading

External links 
 

Transcription factors